Můstek is a Prague Metro station that serves as an interchange point between lines A and B, situated under the lower end of Wenceslas Square. Each line has a separate set of platforms which are connected by a series of corridors. After the excavation of the area, a medieval bridge was discovered and the meaning of the area name Můstek  ("Little Bridge") was fully understood.

The Line A station was opened on 12 August 1978 as part of the inaugural section of Line A, between Leninova and Náměstí Míru. The line B station was opened on 2 November 1985, as part of the inaugural section of Line B between Sokolovská and Smíchovské nádraží.

Můstek A has two exits through escalator tunnels (one on both ends of the middle aisle) with one vestibule below lower (NW) end of the Wenceslas Square where the preserved medieval bridge can be seen and the other below the central part of the square. A system of corridors connects the station of Line A with station of Line B located roughly in the same location, but several metres deeper. Můstek B has one escalator tunnel with a vestibule below Jungmann Square.

The station was renovated in 2015.

Gallery

References

Prague Metro stations
Railway stations opened in 1978
1978 establishments in Czechoslovakia
Railway stations in the Czech Republic opened in the 20th century